Scott Michael "Scotty" Kilmer is an American YouTuber, author, and auto mechanic. His self-titled YouTube channel, Scotty Kilmer, has over 5 million subscribers and his videos have over 2 billion views.

Early life 
Scotty Kilmer was born on October 2, 1953 in Niagara Falls, New York. At age 14, he learned to be a mechanic from his grandfather, Elmer Kilmer, who was the chief mechanic at the Texaco gas station which Scotty's father owned. He studied at York University for his undergraduate degree and then attended the University of Illinois at Urbana–Champaign, receiving a master's degree in anthropology. He was in the process of working towards his Ph.D., but eventually quit due to his dissatisfaction with the university tenure system. Kilmer would then go on to become a mechanic and move to Houston in 1980. Upon the suggestion of his wife, Kilmer wrote a book, Everyone's Guide to Buying a Used Car and Car Maintenance, originally published in 1994. Its release led Kilmer to be on the front page of the Houston Chronicle, which attracted the attention of the local CBS affiliate KHOU.

Career
Before YouTube, Kilmer had a television show on KHOU titled Crank it Up with Scotty. In this series, he showed the audience how to diagnose minor automotive mechanical problems, offered opinions on vehicle engineering, and provided solutions to low-profile problems. In 2004, Crank It Up earned a Regional Emmy Award for "Outstanding Interactivity"; Kilmer subsequently received an Emmy for "Best Interactive Car Talk Host." His YouTube channel is much the same, and he answers questions about car problems and the vehicle industry, and gives advice. Kilmer typically uses his customers' cars in his videos as a point of comparison or other demonstrations with various products he uses as a mechanic.

Publications

References 

Living people
American YouTubers
1953 births
YouTube channels launched in 2007
DIY YouTubers